Bruce Altman (born July 3, 1955) is an American film and television actor. He is a graduate of the Yale School of Drama.

Early life 
Altman was born in The Bronx, New York. He is of Jewish background.

Filmography

Film

Television

References

External links
 
 

American male film actors
American male television actors
Entertainers from the Bronx
Male actors from New York City
Jewish American male actors
People from the Bronx
1955 births
Living people
Yale School of Drama alumni
American people of Jewish descent